Bampton, also called Bampton-in-the-Bush, is a settlement and civil parish in the Thames Valley about  southwest of Witney in Oxfordshire. The parish includes the hamlet of Weald. The 2011 Census recorded the parish's population as 2,564.  Bampton is variously referred to as both a town and a village. The Domesday Book recorded that it was a market town by 1086. It continued as such until the 1890s. It has both a town hall and a village hall.

Geography
The core of the village is on gravel terraces formed of Summertown-Radley or flood plain terrace deposits. It is just east of Shill Brook, which flows south to join the River Thames, and just north of a smaller stream that flows west to join Shill Brook. The A4095 road passes through the village. It is bounded to the south by the River Thames, to the east by Aston Ditch, and to the west and north by ditches and field boundaries. A small part of the airfield of RAF Brize Norton is in northernmost part of the parish.

Early settlement
The Bampton area has been settled since the Iron Age and Roman periods.  The Exeter Book of   1070 records the toponym as Bemtun. The Domesday Book of 1086 records it as Bentone. A charter or roll from 1212 records it as Bamtun. It is derived from the Old English bēam-tūn, which could mean either "tūn by the beam" or "tūn made from beams". Tūn is an Old English word that originally meant a fence, and came to mean an enclosure or homestead.

Parish church

The earliest parts of the Church of England parish church of Saint Mary the Virgin are 10th- or 11th-century, when it was built as a late Saxon Minster. It was rebuilt in the 12th century as a cruciform Norman church. It received Gothic additions from late in the 13th century to early in the 16th century. The architect Ewan Christian restored it in 1868–70. It is a Grade I listed building.

Bampton Castle

In 1315 King Edward II granted Aymer de Valence, 2nd Earl of Pembroke a licence to crenellate at Bampton. He had Bampton Castle built just west of Shill Brook. Much of the building survived until the Commonwealth of England in the 17th century, when the gatehouse and part of the curtain wall were adapted to form Ham Court. It is now a private house and a Grade II* listed building.

Other notable buildings

After the Norman conquest of England, William the Conqueror granted the church of St Mary the Virgin to Leofric, Bishop of Exeter. The Dean and Chapter of Exeter Cathedral have held the advowson of the parish ever since. Late in the 11th or early in the 12th century the Dean and Chapter had a prebendal house built just west of the parish church. There is some 13th-century work on the east wing, and the house was altered and enlarged in the 16th, 17th and 19th centuries. It is now called The Deanery and is a Grade II* listed building.  Weald Manor is a manor house west of Shill Brook and south of Ham Court. It was built in the 17th century and enlarged in 1742. It is a Grade II* listed building.

South of St Mary's is Churchgate House, which used to be the Rectory. The oldest part of the house is 16th-century, with a datestone inscribed "1546 Vicar Joan Dotin". In 1799 a new Georgian main block was added to the front of the building by the builder and architect Daniel Harris.  In 1635 Robert Veysey, a wool merchant, died leaving £100 to build and endow a free school in Bampton. This was built in Church View near the junction with Church Street, the first schoolmaster was appointed in 1650 and the building was completed in 1653. The building is now Bampton's public library. Bampton Town Hall was completed in 1838 and now houses Bampton Arts Centre.

Transport
In 1873 a station was opened in Brize Norton parish. In 1937 RAF Brize Norton was established and in 1940 the Great Western Railway renamed the station . British Railways closed the station and the East Gloucestershire Railway in 1962. Bampton is served by Stagecoach in Oxfordshire bus route 19, which links Carterton and Witney via Standlake. Buses run from Mondays to Saturdays at two-hourly intervals. There is no Sunday or bank holiday service.

Village life

Culture
Bampton has a tradition of Morris dancing which may be 600 years old. Documentary and circumstantial evidence show that Morris dancing in Bampton goes back at least to the 1790s. It used to be performed in Bampton on Whit Monday but the date has recently changed to the late May bank holiday. The town is also the home of Bampton Classical Opera which performs both in Bampton and elsewhere.

Bampton Youth Centre was founded in 1984 in the former Victorian primary school building.

Sport
Bampton Town Football Club is affiliated to the Oxfordshire Football Association and plays at Buckland Road, Bampton. The club has senior, youth, junior, and veteran teams. The Bampton & District Aunt Sally Association, formed in 1971, plays the traditional throwing game Aunt Sally, which is played at pubs almost all of which are in Oxfordshire. Bampton Skatepark was built for the village's skateboarders and BMX riders.

Notable people 

 John Philips (1676 in Bampton – 1709) an 18th-century English poet
 Sir Frederick Whitaker KCMG (1812 in Bampton – 1891) a New Zealand politician, twice the Prime Minister of New Zealand
 Thomas Temple (1818 in Bampton, Oxon – 1899) a farmer, lumberman, businessman and political figure in Fredericton, New Brunswick, Canada
 Walter David Taylor Powell (1831 in Bampton – 1906) an English mariner and paramilitary Australian native police officer in the British colonies of New South Wales and Queensland
 Air Marshal Sir Charles Roderick Carr KBE, CB, DFC, AFC (1891–1971) was a senior Royal Air Force commander from New Zealand; lived in Bampton in retirement (1947-1971)
 Molly Rose OBE, DL, JP (1920–2016) a British aviator, lived in Bampton from 1946 to 1974 & again from 1986 to 2016 
 Thomas Bruce (born 1983 in Bampton) an English cricketer; a left-handed batsman & slow left-arm orthodox bowler

In fiction

Bampton is one of the settings for the fictional crime novels The Chronicles of Hugh de Singleton, set in about 1366, by Mel Starr.  ITV used Bampton for several outdoor locations for the fictional village of Downton, North Yorkshire in the period drama television series Downton Abbey. The main ones included the Old Rectory (Churchgate House), the public library, the parish church of St Mary the Virgin, and houses in Church View that were used to represent two pubs.

References

Bibliography

External links

Bampton Oxfordshire

Civil parishes in Oxfordshire
Cotswolds
Downton Abbey
Villages in Oxfordshire
West Oxfordshire District
People from Bampton, Oxfordshire